Wilma M. Blom is a marine scientist. Since 2011 she has been Curator, Marine Invertebrates at Auckland War Memorial Museum.

Biography 
Blom's work focuses on identifying marine fauna, such as molluscs. She also works in science communication, through projects such as Auckland Museum's New Zealand Marine Life app. She also organises a 2-yearly BioBlitz programme which places scientists alongside communities to help them document the biodiversity of their surrounding area, and has been involved in research projects involving The Noises. She has contributed to the collections of Auckland Museum and Te Papa.

She has been living in Auckland since 1971.

Selected research projects 

 Blom, W. M. (ed.) (2015). New Zealand Marine Life Field Guide (Version 2.0). [Mobile Application Software]. 
 Jocque, M and Blom, W. (2009). Mysidae (Mysida) of New Zealand; a checklist, identification key to species and an overview of material in New Zealand collections. i2304: 1–20
 Krug, P., Morley, M., Asif, J., Hellyar, L. & Blom, W. (2008). Molecular confirmation of species status for the rare cephalaspidean Melanochlamys lorrainae (Rudman, 1968), and comparison with its sister species M. cylindrica Cheeseman, 1881. Journal of Molluscan Studies, 74: 267-276.
 Anderson, M., Diebel, C., Blom, W. and Landers, T. (2005). Consistency and variation in kelp holdfast assemblages: spatial patterns of biodiversity for the major phyla at different taxonomic resolutions. Journal of Experimental Marine Biology and Ecology 320: 35-56.
 Anderson, M., Connell, S., Gillanders, B., Diebel, C., Blom, W., Landers, T. and Saunders, J. (2005). Relationships between taxonomic resolution and spatial scales of multivariate variation in kelp holdfast assemblages. Journal of Animal Ecology 74: 636-646.

References

Living people
Year of birth missing (living people)
New Zealand marine biologists
Science communicators
People associated with the Auckland War Memorial Museum
New Zealand curators